Point Determined was a thoroughbred race horse born in Maryland on March 6, 2003. There were very high expectations of him since he was the largest foal from the first crop of Horse of the Year Point Given in 2003. He was a possible contender for the Triple Crown in 2006.

Connections
Point Determined is owned by the Robert & Beverly Lewis Trust. He is trained by Bob Baffert and is ridden by Rafael Bejarano. He was bred in Maryland by Bowman & Higgins Stable.

Breeding
His sire is Point Given while his dam is Merengue. He was subsequently sold after his racing career at the Keeneland November Sale in 2007 for over $100,000 to Oscar Benavides, an agent. He was moved to the Commonwealth of Kentucky where he entered stud in 2009 at Montesacro Farm.

As of February 2016, stands at Rancho Natoches, La Mochis, Sinaloa, Mexico.

Racing career

References
 Point Determined's pedigree with photo

2003 racehorse births
Thoroughbred family 2-n
Racehorses trained in the United Kingdom
Racehorses bred in Maryland